4 Canadian Mechanized Brigade Group (4CMBG) was a formation of the Canadian Army, then Mobile Command of the unified Canadian Forces. It was part of the European formation known as Canadian Forces Europe. The formation served as the main forward deployed land element of Canada's armed forces, and was stationed in West Germany from 1957 until it was disbanded in 1993.

History 
In 1951, 27th Canadian Infantry Brigade arrived in Europe, to be succeeded by the 1st Canadian Infantry Brigade in 1953, then 2 CIBG in 1955, then 4 CIBG in 1957. In 1959, when 4 CIBG's tour was due to end, a change was made in the reinforcement policy for Germany. Instead of whole brigades rotating every two years, the decision was made to keep 4 CIBG and its associated brigade units in place, instead rotating the major combat elements to Germany every three years.

The presence of the three mechanized infantry battalions led Canada's brigade in Germany to be renamed as 4 Canadian Mechanized Brigade Group on 1 May 1968, three months after Canada's three separate armed forces were unified into the single Canadian Forces.

Around the same time, a review of Canada's foreign policy was announced by the Prime Minister, Pierre Trudeau, part of which involved an investigation into the role of 4 CMBG, which was the Canadian military's main overseas force. The ultimate result of the investigation was the announcement by the prime minister, as part of an overall cut in defence spending, to reduce the Canadian military commitment in Europe by half. 4 CMBG would also be re- rather than its attachment as an active part of BAOR, it would become a reserve attached to either the VII (US) Corps or II (GE) Corps, relocating to Lahr in Southern Germany. This downsizing and re- led to the withdrawal of the tactical nuclear weapons capability.

4 CMBG operated a large force of Canadian tanks and armoured fighting vehicles and remained in place as one of NATO's Cold War tank formations. When the 1st Canadian Division was reactivated in 1989, 4 CMBG became the forward deployed brigade of the division assigned to the Central Army Group. When the Gulf War began in 1990, the possible deployment of 4 CMBG to the Persian Gulf to serve alongside British Army forces in a Commonwealth Division similar to that from the Korean War was looked at and plans were drawn up to serve as the possible larger Canadian ground contribution in the Gulf (Operation Friction) under the name Operation Broadsword. However, logistical and political obstacles at home resulted in this plan being scrapped entirely and 4 CMBG remained in Germany.

The end of the Cold War brought the final draw-down of Canada's military presence in Europe when the brigade was disbanded in 1993.

Organization in 1989 
In 1989 towards the end of the Cold War the brigade was part of the 1st Canadian Mechanized Infantry Division.  It had the following structure:

Although the brigade had a small structure it had some of the most updated and new equipment including: Leopard C-1, Lynx, M109A2, M113, Javelin, Blowpipe, Oerlikon 35mm, and CH-136.

Units serving
The following is a list of major combat units serving in 4 CIBG/4 CMBG:
Armour
The Royal Canadian Dragoons – 1957–1959, 1970–1987
Lord Strathcona's Horse (Royal Canadians) – 1966–1970
8th Canadian Hussars (Princess Louise's) – 1960–1964, 1987–1993
The Fort Garry Horse – 1962–1966
Infantry
1st Battalion, Canadian Guards – 1959–1962
2nd Battalion, Canadian Guards – 1957–1959
1st Battalion, The Royal Canadian Regiment – 1962–1965
2nd Battalion, The Royal Canadian Regiment – 1965–1969
3rd Battalion, The Royal Canadian Regiment – 1977–1984, 1988–1993
1st Battalion, Princess Patricia's Canadian Light Infantry – 1964–1967
2nd Battalion, Princess Patricia's Canadian Light Infantry – 1966–1970, 1984–1988
1st Battalion, Royal 22e Régiment – 1967–1993
2nd Battalion, Royal 22e Régiment – 1965–1969
1st Battalion, The Queen's Own Rifles of Canada – 1960–1964
2nd Battalion, The Queen's Own Rifles of Canada – 1957–1959
2nd Battalion, The Black Watch (Royal Highland Regiment) of Canada – 1962–1965
3rd Mechanized Commando, The Canadian Airborne Regiment – 1970–1977
Artillery
1st Regiment, Royal Canadian Horse Artillery – 1957–1960, 1967–1993
2nd Regiment, Royal Canadian Horse Artillery – 1964–1967
3rd Regiment, Royal Canadian Horse Artillery – 1960–1964

See also

 Military history of Canada
 History of the Canadian Army
 List of armouries in Canada

References

Further reading
Sean M. Maloney, War Without Battles: Canada's NATO Brigade in Germany 1951–1993, McGraw-Hill Ryerson Ltd, (Toronto,Montreal, and others) 1997.

External links
Change of Command marks long period of service in Europe dead link
Canadian Infantry Brigade, British Army of the Rhine  1951-1971, Outline Deployment dead link
4 Canadian Mechanized Brigade Group: Significance of A NATO Force in Germany

Canadian Mechanized Brigade Groups
Military units and formations of the Cold War
Military units and formations established in 1968
Military units and formations disestablished in 1993